This is a list of tallest hospitals, showing all hospital buildings with an architectural height of at least  worldwide that are either completed or structurally topped-out as of June 2019.

See also
History of hospitals
List of hospitals by capacity
List of hospitals by staff
List of tallest buildings in the world
List of the oldest hospitals in the United States

References

Hospitals
Hospitals
Tallest in the world